Essentials & Rarities (previously announced as Memories & Rarities) is a compilation album by Jean-Michel Jarre, released in 2011. The double CD set consists of two distinctive CDs: Essentials, which is a compilation of Jarre's most famous work, and Rarities, which compiles tracks made before his ground-breaking album Oxygène.

Most of the tracks on Rarities had never been officially released on CD  (apart from tracks from Les Granges Brûlées). The Rarities CD includes a selection of tracks from Deserted Palace, his first single "La Cage" and its B-side "Erosmachine", and the track "Happiness Is a Sad Song", which he composed in 1968 for "Les Fêtes de la Jeunesse" in Reims and is Jean-Michel Jarre's first musical release. Both "Happiness Is a Sad Song" and "La Cage / Erosmachine" were composed during Jarre's time at the Groupe Recherche Musicale.

The album was released in memory of Francis Dreyfus, the founder of Jarre's first record label Disques Dreyfus who died the previous year.

Track listing 

CD 1 – ESSENTIALS
"Souvenir of China" – 3:59
"Oxygene 2" – 3:12
"Arpegiateur" – 6:16
"Oxygene 4" – 4:14
"Equinoxe 4" – 6:42
"Calypso 2" – 2:28
"Zoolook"  – 3:52
"Magnetic Fields 1" – 5:20
"Magnetic Fields 2" – 4:02
"Equinoxe 5" – 3:55
"Industrial Revolution 2" – 2:22
"Rendez-Vous 4" – 3:59
"Gloria, Lonely Boy" – 5:30
"Oxygene 6" – 6:21
"Space of Freedom"  – 8:02

CD 2 – RARITIES
"Happiness Is a Sad Song" – 5:53 
"Hypnose" – 3:29 
"Erosmachine" – 2:58
"La Cage" – 3:23
"Chanson des Granges Brûlées / Song of the Burnt Barns" – 2:45
"Windswept Canyon" – 7:39
"The Abominable Snowman" – 0:52
"Deserted Palace" – 2:22
"Le Pays de Rose / Roseland" – 2:01
"Rain Forest Rap Session" – 1:40
"Black Bird" – 3:06 
"Music Box Concerto" – 2:41
"Iraqi Hitch-Hiker" – 2:25
"Les Granges Brûlées / The Burnt Barns" – 3:13
"La Cage Vitalic RMX" – 4:16 
"Erosmachine Vitalic RMX" – 3:45

Certifications

References

External links
 Essentials & Rarities at Discogs

2011 greatest hits albums
Jean-Michel Jarre albums